The Primary Stages Marvin and Anne Einhorn School of Performing Arts (ESPA) is an interdisciplinary institution in New York City that offers courses in Acting, Writing and Directing.

History

ESPA developed from a collection of in-house playwriting classes at Primary Stages to a more formalized multidisciplinary institution with departments in acting, writing, and directing. Since its 2007 inception, the School has housed over two thousand students. The School, formally known as the Primary Stages School of Theater was renamed in 2010 in honor of two Primary Stages founding members, Marvin and Anne Einhorn.

All courses are taught by industry professionals that include Primary Stages staff members Casey Childs (Founder and Executive Producer of Primary Stages), Andrew Leynse (Artistic Director), Michelle Bossy (Associate Artistic Director).

Courses

Writing courses have included: The First Draft, The Rewrite, Comedy Writing, Adaptation, Experimental Theater, Lyric Writing, The Libretto and Television Writing.

Acting courses have included: On-Camera Acting, Advanced Scene Study, Musical Theater Auditioning, Improvisation, Shakespeare, Auditioning for Television and Film, Solo Performance and The Voiceover.

Directing Courses have included: Site-Specific Directing, Directing for Actors, Introduction to Independent Film-Making, and Directing Edward Albee.

Instructors

ESPA faculty members:

David Adjmi
Betsy Aidem
Tanya Barfield
B.H. Barry
Brooke Berman
Mark Blum
Jim Boerlin
Michelle Bossy
Karen Braga
Christopher Burney
David Caudle
Casey Childs
Constance Congdon
Kara Lee Corthron
Cusi Cram
Denny Dillon
Gary Donatelli
Sarah Elliott
Carl Forsman
Elliot Fox
Jackson Gay
Joanna Gleason
Randy Graff
David Grimm
Adam Gwon
Jessica Hecht
Harriet Harris
Michael Hollinger
Judith Ivey
Morgan Jenness
Julia Jordan
Kait Kerrigan
Stephanie Klapper
Lisa Kron
Neil LaBute
Michael Laibson
Tessa LaNeve
Linda and David Laundra
Andrew Leynse
Judith Light
Bree Lowdermilk
Craig Lucas
Cynthia Mace
Rogelio Martinez
Itamar Moses
Dael Orlandersmith
Adam Reist
Lisa Rothe
Sarah Ruhl
Edwin Sanchez
Julian Sheppard
Leigh Silverman
Blair Singer
Saviana Stanescu
Daniel Talbott
Lucy Thurber
Richard Topol
Francine Volpe
Kim Weild
Sheri Wilner
Mary Louise Wilson
Walton Wilson

Special programs

Previous guests and Master Class instructors have included Judith Light, Craig Lucas, Neil LaBute, Pam MacKinnon, David Lindsay-Abaire, Alice Ripley, Jessica Hecht, Annie Baker and José Rivera.

Each Summer, the ESPA*Drills new play development program affords four ESPA playwrights the opportunity to workshop their plays at Primary Stages and present full readings. The playwrights work with ESPA actors and directors as well as other New York artists.

ESPA also offers frequent workshops, jam sessions, and opportunities for new works to be read.

References

Theatre in New York City
Drama schools
Film schools in New York (state)